Vick Lee King (born February 4, 1980) is a former American football running back of the National Football League. He was signed by the Tennessee Titans as an undrafted free agent in 2004. He played college football at McNeese State.

College career
In three seasons at McNeese State Vick rushed for 3,167 yards (5.6avg) 26 TD and caught 23 passes for 128 yards and 1 Touchdown. His accolades include: 
2003 Walter Payton Award Semi-Finalist
Blue-Gray Game Participant
Southland Conference Offensive Player of the Year
1st Team Dan Hansen Football Gazette All-South Team
4th All-Time Leading Rusher
7th All-Time Leader in Career Touchdowns.

Professional career
King was a member of the Miami Dolphins and New York Jets.

References 

1980 births
Living people
Sportspeople from Houma, Louisiana
American football running backs
Southern Jaguars football players
McNeese Cowboys football players
Tennessee Titans players
Miami Dolphins players
New York Jets players
Players of American football from Louisiana